The European Tour 2013/2014 – Event 4 (also known as the 2013 Arcaden Paul Hunter Classic) was a professional minor-ranking snooker tournament that took place between 22 and 25 August 2013 in Fürth, Germany.

Mark Selby was the defending champion, but he lost 2–4 against Ronnie O'Sullivan in the semi-finals.

O'Sullivan won his 51st professional title by defeating Gerard Greene 4–0 in the final. Greene reached his first final at an event carrying ranking points.

Prize fund and ranking points 
The breakdown of prize money and ranking points of the event is shown below:

1 Only professional players can earn ranking points.

Main draw

Preliminary rounds

Round 1 
Best of 7 frames

Round 2 
Best of 7 frames

Round 3 
Best of 7 frames

Round 4 
Best of 7 frames

Main rounds

Top half

Section 1

Section 2

Section 3

Section 4

Bottom half

Section 5

Section 6

Section 7

Section 8

Finals

Century breaks 

 133, 116  Ricky Walden
 133, 108  Ian Burns
 127  Oliver Brown
 126  Thepchaiya Un-Nooh
 123  Darren Cook
 122  Stuart Bingham
 121  Kurt Maflin
 119, 104  Michael White
 118  Mark Selby
 116, 101  Joe Swail
 111  Anthony McGill
 110  Ronnie O'Sullivan
 108  Marcus Campbell

 104  Alfie Burden
 103  David Grace
 103  Alan McManus
 103  David Gilbert
 102, 100  Ali Carter
 101, 101  Martin Gould
 101  Jamie Clarke
 101  Fergal O'Brien
 100  Ashley Carty
 100  Marco Fu
 100  Mark Joyce
 100  Gerard Greene
 100  Sam Baird

References

External links 

 2013 Arcaden Paul Hunter Classic – Pictures by Sandy Giet at Facebook

2013
ET4
2013 in German sport